In mathematics, a fundamental theorem is a theorem which is considered to be central and conceptually important for some topic. For example, the fundamental theorem of calculus gives the relationship between differential calculus and integral calculus. The names are mostly traditional, so that for example the fundamental theorem of arithmetic is basic to what would now be called number theory. Some of these are classification theorems of objects which are mainly dealt with in the field. For instance, the fundamental theorem of curves describe classification of regular curves in space up to translation, rotation.

Likewise, the mathematical literature sometimes refers to the fundamental lemma of a field. The term lemma is conventionally used to denote a proven proposition which is used as a stepping stone to a larger result, rather than as a useful statement in-and-of itself.

Fundamental theorems of mathematical topics
 Fundamental theorem of algebra
 Fundamental theorem of algebraic K-theory
 Fundamental theorem of arithmetic
 Fundamental theorem of Boolean algebra
 Fundamental theorem of calculus
 Fundamental theorem of calculus for line integrals
 Fundamental theorem of curves
 Fundamental theorem of cyclic groups
 Fundamental theorem of equivalence relations
 Fundamental theorem of exterior calculus
 Fundamental theorem of finitely generated abelian groups
 Fundamental theorem of finitely generated modules over a principal ideal domain
 Fundamental theorem of finite distributive lattices
 Fundamental theorem of Galois theory
 Fundamental theorem of geometric calculus
 Fundamental theorem on homomorphisms
 Fundamental theorem of ideal theory in number fields
 Fundamental theorem of Lebesgue integral calculus
 Fundamental theorem of linear algebra
 Fundamental theorem of linear programming
 Fundamental theorem of noncommutative algebra
 Fundamental theorem of projective geometry
 Fundamental theorem of random fields
 Fundamental theorem of Riemannian geometry
 Fundamental theorem of tessarine algebra
 Fundamental theorem of symmetric polynomials
 Fundamental theorem of topos theory
 Fundamental theorem of ultraproducts
 Fundamental theorem of vector analysis
Carl Friedrich Gauss referred to the law of quadratic reciprocity as the "fundamental theorem" of quadratic residues.

Applied or informally stated "fundamental theorems"
There are also a number of "fundamental theorems" that are not directly related to mathematics:
 Fundamental theorem of arbitrage-free pricing
 Fisher's fundamental theorem of natural selection
 Fundamental theorems of welfare economics
 Fundamental equations of thermodynamics
 Fundamental theorem of poker
 Holland's schema theorem, or the "fundamental theorem of genetic algorithms"
 Glivenko–Cantelli theorem, or the "fundamental theorem of statistics"
 Fundamental theorem of software engineering

Fundamental lemmata 

 Fundamental lemma of calculus of variations
 Fundamental lemma of Langlands and Shelstad
 Fundamental lemma of sieve theory

See also 
Main theorem of elimination theory
List of theorems
Toy theorem

References

External links

"Some Fundamental Theorems in Mathematics" (Knill, 2018) - self-described "expository hitchhikers guide", or exploration, of around 130 fundamental/influential mathematical results and their significance, across a range of mathematical fields.

Theorems,Fundamental
Fundamental

es:Teorema fundamental
ka:ფუნდამენტური თეორემა